Olu is a popular name amongst people of the Yoruba ethnic group. It is usually the first three letters of the full name.
"Olu" is a diminutive of "Oluwa" in the Yoruba language and it can mean God, deity or lord, so the name 'Oluwale' could mean "My God has come home". Since the name is applied to people, however, god in the sense of deity or lord is what is usually accepted, with the word even being used as a royal or noble title in certain parts of Nigeria, Benin and Togo.

Persons with the name Olu
 Olubowale Victor Akintimehin, Nigerian American rapper
 Olu Babalola, British professional basketball player
 Olu Dara, African-American jazz musician
 Olu Falae, Nigerian politician and traditional nobleman
 Olu Oguibe, Nigerian-American art historian and artist
 Olu Oyesanya, Nigerian journalist
 Olu Jacobs, Nigerian actor
 Olu Maintain, Nigerian musician
 Olu O. Fann, African-American rapper

References

Nigerian culture
Yoruba given names